Tara Music (formerly known as Tara Records) has been regarded for many years as one of the leading traditional Irish music recording companies. The label was set up by Jack Fitzgerald and John Cook in the early 1970s.

Their first release was the album Prosperous by a young Christy Moore, still largely unknown at the time. There was quite a gap between that album coming out and anything further being released. Then, in the early eighties, there were two albums from Planxty (After The Break and The Woman I Loved So Well), two further solo albums from Moore (The Iron Behind the Velvet and Live In Dublin), as well as two albums from Clannad (Crann Úll and Fuaim), followed by the first of numerous albums from Stockton's Wing.

In the late seventies, Tara recorded Shaun Davey's The Brendan Voyage, a ground-breaking album which featured uilleann piper Liam O'Flynn as a soloist with a full orchestra. The Brendan Voyage launched Davey as a contemporary orchestral composer of international standard and led to further commissions for work in a similar vein, several of which (The Pilgrim, Granuaile and The Relief of Derry Symphony) have been released on the Tara label. Most of Davey's works feature O'Flynn and vocalist Rita Connolly, both of whom have also recorded numerous solo albums for the Tara label under Davey's supervision as producer.

The Irish phenomenon that is Riverdance has musical roots that had been developing over many years prior to the first performance of Riverdance at Eurovision song contest in 1994. These roots included musical elements introduced by Andy Irvine who, having returned to Ireland from the Balkans, introduced Eastern European music and time signatures to the group Planxty, who then proceeded to record a number of these instrumental pieces. Irvine and Davy Spillane also recorded the East Wind album, which was produced by Bill Whelan, possibly the first seeds of what became Riverdance.

Tara Music also released Whelan's first major orchestral work, The Seville Suite and his most recent release: The Connemara Suite. Other albums, such as Spillane's Out of the Air and Pipedreams, as well as The Storm by Moving Hearts, feature some of the musical elements and instruments that are easily recognizable in their influence on the Riverdance music.

In recent years, many releases on the Tara Music label are recordings by self-produced artists, with Tara Music acting as distributor and coordinating press and publicity. Albums by artists such as: Frankie Gavin & De Dannan, The Voice Squad, Zoë Conway, Máirtín O'Connor and Michelle Lally are currently available on the Tara Music label.

References

Bibliography

Catalogue
	

Irish record labels
IFPI members